Alejandra Frances Ramos Ruiz (born 1 July 1996) is an American-born Peruvian footballer who plays as a midfielder. She has been a member of the Peru women's national team.

Early life
Ramos was born to Peruvian parents in Washington, D.C. and raised in Rockville, Maryland.

College career
Ramos attended the Montgomery College.

International career
Ramos represented Peru at the 2012 South American U-17 Women's Championship and two South American U-20 Women's Championship editions (2014 and 2015). At senior level, she played the 2014 Copa América Femenina.

References 

1996 births
Living people
Citizens of Peru through descent
Peruvian women's footballers
Women's association football midfielders
Peru women's international footballers
Soccer players from Washington, D.C.
Sportspeople from Rockville, Maryland
Soccer players from Maryland
American women's soccer players
Montgomery College alumni
American sportspeople of Peruvian descent
21st-century American women